The Caleb Greene House is an historic house in Warwick, Rhode Island.

The -story wood frame Federal era house was built in 1800 by Caleb Greene, a local businessman. Caleb Greene was a cousin to the American Revolutionary War General Nathanael Greene and the father to Major General George Sears Greene, the man credited with holding the right flank of the Union Army on Culp's Hill at the Battle of Gettysburg on July 2, 1863.

The house, one of the better-preserved of the period in the Apponaug area of Warwick, was listed on the National Register of Historic Places in 1978.

See also
National Register of Historic Places listings in Kent County, Rhode Island

References

Houses completed in 1800
Houses on the National Register of Historic Places in Rhode Island
Houses in Warwick, Rhode Island
National Register of Historic Places in Kent County, Rhode Island
Federal architecture in Rhode Island
Greene family of Rhode Island